Andrei Konev (born 26 January 1989 in Miass) is a professional ice hockey defenceman who is currently an unrestricted free agent who most recently played for PSK Sakhalin of Asia League Ice Hockey (ALIH). He originally played in the KHL with Traktor Chelyabinsk.

References

External links

1989 births
Living people
People from Miass
Admiral Vladivostok players
Belye Medvedi Chelyabinsk players
HC Donbass players
Lokomotiv Yaroslavl players
PSK Sakhalin players
Russian ice hockey defencemen
Salavat Yulaev Ufa players
Severstal Cherepovets players
HC Sibir Novosibirsk players
Traktor Chelyabinsk players
Yermak Angarsk players
Yuzhny Ural Orsk players
Sportspeople from Chelyabinsk Oblast